Albert Foulds (8 August 1919 – 7 April 1993) was an English footballer who played as an inside forward in the Football League for Chester, Rochdale, Crystal Palace and Crewe Alexandra.

References

1919 births
1993 deaths
Footballers from Salford
Association football inside forwards
English footballers
Altrincham F.C. players
Chester City F.C. players
Yeovil Town F.C. players
Rochdale A.F.C. players
Scarborough F.C. players
Crystal Palace F.C. players
Crewe Alexandra F.C. players
Congleton Town F.C. players
English Football League players